Mohamed Trabelsi (born 7 January 1968), also known as Bakkaou, is a retired Tunisian footballer who played as defender.

Trabelsi played for Océano Club de Kerkennah, as well as for Club Africain and Stade Tunisien.

He also played eight games with the Tunisia national football team, and was a member of the Tunisian squad at the 1994 African Cup of Nations finals in Tunisia.

Wins as player
Arab Champions League
Winner: 1997

References

Living people
1968 births
Tunisian footballers
Tunisia international footballers
1994 African Cup of Nations players
Tunisian Ligue Professionnelle 1 players
Club Africain players
Stade Tunisien players
Océano Club de Kerkennah players
Association football defenders